Minot is a city located in north central North Dakota in the United States.

Minot may also refer to:

Places
United States
 Minot, Maine, a town in Androscoggin County
 Minot, Massachusetts, a locality in Plymouth County
 Minot, Mississippi, a locality in Sunflower County
 Minot's Ledge, a reef off the harbor of Cohasset, Massachusetts

France
 Minot, Côte-d'Or, a commune in the region of Bourgogne in eastern France

People
 Ann Stone Minot (1894–1980), American biochemist and physiologist.
 George Minot (1885–1950), winner of the 1934 Nobel Prize in Physiology or Medicine
 Charles Sedgwick Minot (1852–1914), American anatomist
 Fanny E. Minot (1847-1919), American public worker
 Henry Minot (1859–1890), American ornithologist and railroad investor
 Laurence Minot (aviator) (1896–1917), British World War I flying ace
 Laurence Minot (poet), 14th-century English poet
 Maxime Minot (born 1987), French politician
 Susan Minot (born 1956), American novelist and short story writer
 Stephen Minot (1927-2010), American novelist and short story writer
 Minot Judson Savage (1841–1918), American clergyman

Other uses
 Minot (unit), a unit of dry volume used in France prior to metrication